Roses Bloom on the Moorland (German: Rosen blühen auf dem Heidegrab) is a 1929 German silent historical drama film directed by Kurt Blachy and starring Wolfgang von Schwind, Hertha Guthmar and Betty Astor. During the Napoleonic Wars a German inhabitant is sentenced to death for striking a French soldier who assaulted his wife.

Some scenes were shot on location on Lüneburg Heath. The film's sets were designed by August Rinaldi. It received a generally poor reception from critics on its release.

Cast
 Wolfgang von Schwind as Martin Schlaeger, Dorfschulze
 Hertha Guthmar as Luise, seine Tochter
 Alfons Fryland as Joachim Schlaeger, Heidebauer
 Betty Astor as Anna, seine Frau
 Dietrich Henkels as Joachim, beider Sohn
 Karl Falkenberg as Bracke, Steuereinnehmer
 Gerhard Dammann as  Mertens, Gastwirt
 Renate Noack as Martha, seine Tochter
 Robert Leffler as Pfarrer Holten
 Rudolf Klein-Rhoden as Klaus, der Köhler
 Anna Müller-Lincke as eine Magd
 Ferdinand von Alten as Hauptmann Maray
 Gerd Briese as junger Ehemann
 Hanni Reinwald as junge Ehefrau
 Alfred Loretto as Hannes, der Schmied
 Max Maximilian as Jean, Offiziersbursche
 Karl Platen as Schäfer
 Paul Rehkopf as Korporal Landry
 Ernst Rückert as Leutnant de Vale
 Magnus Stifter as Major Roisson

References

Bibliography
 Alfred Krautz. International directory of cinematographers, set- and costume designers in film, Volume 4. Saur, 1984.

External links

1929 films
Films of the Weimar Republic
German silent feature films
Films directed by Kurt Blachy
Films set in the 1800s
German historical drama films
1920s historical drama films
German black-and-white films
1929 drama films
Silent historical drama films
1920s German films
1920s German-language films